Clifton is a large suburban village and historic manor in the city of Nottingham, England. In 2020 it had an estimated population of 22,749.

Clifton has two council wards in the City of Nottingham (Clifton West and Clifton East as of 2018) with a total population taken at the 2011 census (prior wards of Clifton North and Clifton South) of 26,835. The location also encompasses Clifton Grove and Clifton Village, a residential area set alongside the River Trent.

The Manor of Clifton was for many centuries the seat of the de Clifton (later Clifton) family, branches of which were in the 17th century created Baron Clifton of Leighton Bromswold (1608) and Clifton baronets (1611). It is now the site of a council estate. The village is also notable for many old buildings including Clifton Hall, which is the former seat of the Clifton family, and St. Mary's Church.

Clifton is also home to the Nottingham Trent University Clifton Campus.

History

The manor of Clifton was recorded in the Domesday Book of 1086 as having a church and a mill. The value of the manor had decreased since the Norman Conquest of 1066 from £16 to £9. For 700 years the Clifton family of Clifton owned the manor, of which their manor house was Clifton Hall. The papers of the Clifton family and their lands are held at Manuscripts and Special Collections, The University of Nottingham.

Prior to Clifton being subsumed into the city, the area was previously within a civil parish called Clifton with Glapton until 1952, Glapton being a small scattering of houses and farms prior to when the estate was built, and was in the area approximately where present day Glapton Lane is, there still being some older houses that predate the estate along the lane.

Modern Clifton
The council estate has a number of shop-clusters and relatively good transport links (by tram and bus) with the city (~20 minutes) and surrounding areas. The village is on the A453 road which is the main connection between Nottingham and the M1 motorway south. The section of the A453 from Kegworth to the roundabout next to the Crusader pub has been upgraded to dual carriageway; this project was completed by 2016. A new retail park known as 'Clifton Triangle' was built on the site of derelict industrial buildings and was completed in 2018.

Clifton Council Estate
The Clifton Council Estate is a sprawling conurbation, which was first considered for residential construction in 1950 by Act of Parliament, and at one time the largest council estate in Europe. The majority of the houses are made of "no fines" concrete (concrete which only has large aggregate included).  This leaves air filled voids which add thermal insulation. Since the 1980s most of the houses have passed from council to private ownership. Clifton (like some of Nottingham's other estates) has benefitted in recent years from some redevelopment and regeneration work such as the Lark Hill walled community for the elderly, but the estate as a whole still attracts a lot of anti-social behaviour, particularly around the shops and tram stops. There are currently plans for a new community on a large area of land south of Clifton, to be known as Fairham.

Governance

Local government matters are administered by Nottingham City Council, a Labour run unitary authority.

Clifton is split into two wards:
 Clifton West includes Wilford, Silverdale, the Clifton Grove Estate, Clifton Village, Barton Green, Nobel Road Estate, Lark Hill Retirement Village and the Brooksby Lane and Sturgeon Avenue areas of the original 1950's Clifton Council Estate. It is represented by Cllrs Andrew Rule and Roger Steel (both Conservative).
 Clifton East includes the rest of Clifton, effectively covering the vast majority of the original 1950's Clifton Council Estate. It is represented on Nottingham City Council by councillor(s) Kevin Clarke, Kirsty Jones and Maria Watson (all representing the area as Nottingham Independents).

Parliamentary, Clifton falls within the Nottingham South constituency, with Lilian Greenwood (Labour) the current Member of Parliament.

Education
Primary schools include The Milford Academy, Glapton, Whitegate, Highbank, Dovecote (an amalgamation of Greencroft, Brooksby and Brinkhill) and Blessed Robert Widmerpool (Catholic). Farnborough Spencer Academy on Farnborough Road is the mainstream secondary school for the area, while Nethergate School on Swansdowne Drive is an all-through special school. Nottingham Trent University has one of its campuses on Clifton Lane (A453). On Farnborough Road was also one of the Central College Nottingham campuses which is now redundant and being sold. The old Fairham School site is also redundant.

On what is now wasteland, accessible from Brooksby Lane or Silverdale Walk, remain the foundations of the original Brooksby School, which was burnt down in the early 1980s. Brooksby school was then moved to the location now known as Dovecote School taking a building originally a part of Greencroft School.

Sport

Clifton has seven football teams: Clifton All Whites, Clifton Aces, Clifton Blacks, Clifton Wanderers, Clifton FC, FC Olympico And Clifton Mad Squad (CMS)

Most famous football players are Viv Anderson, Jermaine Jenas and Darren Huckerby

Clifton Playing fields, behind Farnborough School, off Farnborough Road hosts Clifton parkrun, that is a 5k timed run.  The run was launched in January 2018, and is run on a mixture of trail paths and grass. Some sections of the course may accumulate mud, leaves and puddles after rain.  The start and finish are located behind the pavilion building and are a short walk from the car park. The course follows the perimeter of two Clifton playing fields and alongside Fairham Brook.  The route is run mainly on grass and consists of two full anticlockwise laps of the perimeter and a further short lap of part of the large playing field.  For more information on Clifton parkrun click here.

Transport

Tram service
Clifton is the terminus of line 2 of the Nottingham Express Transit tramway, which opened in August 2015. The line runs from a terminus at a park and ride site just to the west of Clifton, through Clifton, Wilford, and Nottingham City Centre, before continuing to Phoenix Park in the north of the city. Trams run at frequencies that vary between 4 and 8 trams per hour, depending on the day and time of day. The following stops are in, or near to, Clifton:

Southchurch Drive
Rivergreen
Clifton Centre
Holy Trinity
Summerwood Lane
Clifton South

Bus services

Notable people

 Jake Bugg, musician
 Brendan Clarke-Smith, politician
 Karl Collins, actor
 Samantha Morton, actress
 Jayne Torvill, ice skater, Olympic gold medallist
 Viv Anderson, footballer
 Darren Huckerby, footballer
 Jermaine Jenas, footballer
 Graham Dury, comic creator

References
Notes

Bibliography

History of Clifton

External links

 Clifton Village website
Papers of the Clifton family, held at Manuscripts and Special Collections at The University of Nottingham
 Pictures of Clifton Village from Nottingham21

 
Villages in Nottinghamshire
Areas of Nottingham
Nottingham